"No Letting Go" is a song by Jamaican reggae fusion artist Wayne Wonder. The song was written by Wonder and Steven "Lenky" Marsden, and produced by Marsden. It was included on Wonder's 2003 studio album No Holding Back and was released as the lead single from the album. The single was released worldwide on 21 January 2003 and charted at a peak position of number three in the UK Singles Chart. It also peaked at number 11 in the Billboard Hot 100 in the United States. 

It remains Wonder's most successful single to date.  “I had been working with him [Marsden] for years when he was playing live music so when he switched over to music production, I transitioned with him. I actually gave him my first two door Civic. I signed over the title to him and everything, and he gave me my most successful hit.

The song was one of the many hits from the jumpy handclap riddim known as the Diwali Riddim, that was also produced by Marsden.

Content
According to Wayne Wonder, the song is about a girl that he once knew but he doesn't mention her name. He said in an interview with MTV in 2003 "I just wrote this song [about a girl] without calling her name in the song because she always said to me, 'You are always [calling] these other girls' names.' I said, 'I don’t have to call your name, I'll just write a song and you can appreciate it.'" He was also amazed by the success that the song had achieved, saying "Everybody loves it, which is surprising to me. When I'm writing, I don’t think [about whether the song] will be a big hit."

Remix
The official remix features rappers LL Cool J & Queen Duchess. The remix also uses more of the Diwali Riddim beat.

Music video
The music video was directed by Director X, and filmed in Ocho Rios, Jamaica, in December 2002. Wonder said that "It took us 24 hours [to shoot]... It was raining in the morning and the shoot was supposed to start at like 6:30 a.m. and it never really got started until about maybe 8 o'clock... The video, to me, was a success; the dances, everyone enjoying themselves on the stage, there was no bad vibe."

Track listings

US CD single
 "No Letting Go" (Album version) - 3:22
 "No Letting Go" (Alternate mix) - 3:43

European enhanced CD single
 "No Letting Go" (Album version) - 3:25
 "No Letting Go" (Alternate mix) - 3:44
 "No Letting Go" (Instrumental) - 3:40
 "No Letting Go" (Video)

US 12-inch vinyl
A1. "No Letting Go" (Album version) - 3:22
B1. "No Letting Go" (Alternate mix) - 3:43
B2. "No Letting Go" (Instrumental) - 3:43

German 12-inch vinyl
A1. "No Letting Go" (Album version) - 3:22
A2. "No Letting Go" (Alternate mix) - 3:41
B1. "No Letting Go" (Instrumental) - 3:22
B2. "No Letting Go" (Alternate mix instrumental) - 3:41

US 12-inch vinyl (Remix)
A1. "No Letting Go (Remix)" (Club Mix featuring LL Cool J & Queen Duchess) - 3:29
A2. "No Letting Go (Remix)" (Radio Mix featuring LL Cool J & Queen Duchess) - 3:16
A3. "No Letting Go (Remix)" (Remix Instrumental) - 3:45
B1. "No Letting Go" (Album version) - 3:22
B2. "No Letting Go" (Instrumental) - 3:32

Reception
Blender magazine's called the song "a fetching love song that paired his [Wonder's] accented tenor with rough, digital funk". Rolling Stone were critical of the album but called this song "mesmerizing".

Charts and certifications

Weekly charts

Year-end charts

Certifications

Release history

Dirty Werk version

In 2019, the American house/remix duo Dirty Werk released an electro dance version of "No Letting Go", which is more of a cover that is mixed with portions taken from the original. The updated version gave Dirty Werk its second number one on Billboards Dance Club Songs chart in the issue dated 2 November 2019.

Track listing
Remixes EP
 "No Letting Go" (Dirty Werk House Remix) – 3:12
 "No Letting Go" (Kue Radio Mix) – 3:44
 "No Letting Go" (Alex Acosta Peak Hour Remix) – 3:21
 "No Letting Go" (Lemi Vice Remix) – 3:34
 "No Letting Go" (Dave Matthias Remix) – 3:03
 "No Letting Go" (Perry Twins Remix) – 3:23

Charts

References

2003 singles
2019 singles
Electro house songs
Reggae fusion songs
Song recordings produced by Steven "Lenky" Marsden
Songs written by Steven "Lenky" Marsden
Wayne Wonder songs